Ksar El Majaz is a small town and rural commune near the Mediterranean coast in the Jebala region of northwest Morocco, between Tangier and Ceuta.  Administratively, it belongs to Fahs-Anjra Province and the region of Tanger-Tetouan-Al Hoceima.  By the census of 2004, it had a population of 8949 people who are nearly all Moroccan inhabitants in 1735 households.

References

Former Portuguese colonies
Populated places in Fahs-Anjra Province
Rural communes of Tanger-Tetouan-Al Hoceima